Frederick Power may refer to:

 F. Danvers Power (1861–1955), Australian academic
 Frederick Belding Power (1853–1927), American chemist